Greatest Hymns, Vol. 2 is a 2016 album by CCM group Selah. It was released August 26, 2016 by Curb Records.

Critical reception

Rocky Logan reviews Greatest Hymns, Vol. 2 for Absolutely Gospel and gives it 4 out of a possible 5 stars. He writes, "Another great group of songs from one the very best at capturing the enduring spirit of the past and weaving it in with the present."

Jessie Clarks of The Christian Beat remarks, "Greatest Hymns, Vol. 2, the latest release from multi Dove Award-winners Selah, has landed at #1 on Nielsen SoundScan’s Inspirational chart this week."

Track listing

Musicians
Amy Perry – Vocals, Stomps & Claps (Track 10)
Allan Hall – Vocals, Piano (Tracks 1-6, 9-14, 16-18), Rhodes (Track 7)
Todd Smith – Vocals, Stomps & Claps (Track 10)
Garth Justice – Drums (Tracks 2, 10, 14)
David Davidson – Strings (Tracks 1, 3, 9, 13), Solo Violin (Track 13)
David Angell – Strings (Tracks 1, 3, 9, 13)
Monisa Angell – Strings (Tracks 1, 3, 9, 13)
John Catchings – Strings (Tracks 1, 3, 9, 13)
Jim Grosjean – Strings (Tracks 3, 9)
Pam Sixfin – Strings (Tracks 3, 9)
Catherine Umstead – Strings (Tracks 3, 9)
Alan Umstead – Strings (Tracks 3, 9)
Conni Ellisor – Strings (Tracks 3, 9)
Carolyn Bailey – Strings (Tracks 3, 9)
Anthony LaMarchina – Strings (Tracks 3, 9)
Paul Mills – String Arrangement (Tracks 1, 3, 9, 13)
Eric Darken – Percussion (Tracks 1, 8, 10, 12)
Tim Lauer – Accordion (Tracks 1, 13)
Vicki Hampton – Choir (Tracks 2, 14)
Bob Bailey – Choir (Tracks 2, 14)
Jerard Woods – Choir (Tracks 2, 14)
Jovaun Woods – Choir (Track 14)
Matt Pierson – Bass (Tracks 2, 10, 14)
Biff Watson – Acoustic Guitar (Tracks 2, 10, 14)
Jerry McPherson – Electric Guitar (Tracks 2, 7, 10, 14)
Gordon Mote – Organ (Track 6)
John Catchings – Cello (Track 7)
Ellie, Abby & Kate Smith – Kids Vocals (Track 8)
Steven Sheehan – Acoustic Guitar & Bowed Acoustic (Track 8)
Noah Hungate – Drums (Track 8)
David Hungate – Bass (Track 8)
Jason Kyle Saetveit – Drums (Track 10), Background Vocals (Track 10), Stomps & Claps (Track 10)
Jakk Kincaid – Acoustic Guitar (Track 12)

Production
Allan Hall – Producer (Tracks 1-14, 16-18)
Jason Kyle – Producer (Tracks 1-14, 16-18)
Todd Smith – Producer (Tracks 1-14, 16-18)
Ed Cash – Producer (Track 15)
Doug Sax – Mastering (Tracks 1-13)
Sangwook "Sunny" Nam – Mastering (Tracks 1-13)
Adam Ayan – Compiled, Mastering (Tracks 14-18)
Caleb Kuhl – Photography
Blair Munday – Art Direction
Lee Steffen – Photography
Bryan Stewart – A&R
Jandy Works – Design

Track information and credits verified from the album's liner notes.

Charts

References

External links
Selah Official Site
Curb Records Official Site

2016 albums
Curb Records albums
Selah (band) albums